Iran competed in the 2017 Asian Winter Games in Sapporo, Japan from February 19 to 26. The country competed in one sport (two disciplines).

Alpine skier Hossein Saveh-Shemshaki was the country's flagbearer during the parade of nations at the opening ceremony.

Iran was scheduled to enter a cross-country skiing team. However, the FIS Nordic World Ski Championships 2017 in Lahti, Finland also happened during the games (between February 22 and March 5) which had caused Iran to not send a team at all. Iran was also scheduled to compete in ice hockey, however after arriving, more than half the team was deemed ineligible to represent the country due to eligibility issues. Thus the team was disqualified. However the country still played its matches as friendlies, but they did not count towards the standings.

Competitors

Results by event

Skiing

Alpine

Men

Women

Snowboarding

Men

Women

References

Nations at the 2017 Asian Winter Games
Iran at the Asian Winter Games
2017 in Iranian sport